Mirpur is a thana of Dhaka city, Bangladesh. It is bounded by Pallabi Thana to the north, Mohammadpur Thana to the south, Kafrul to the east, and Savar Upazila to the west.

History 
Mirpur thana was established in 1962. The thana consists of one union porishod, eight wards, 11 mouzas and 86 and 20 villages. Mirpur Thana (town) area was included in Keraniganj Thana during the British period (1757 to 1947) and in Tejgaon Thana during the Pakistan period (1947 to 1971). After the Liberation War following the victory day, Mirpur was independent on 31 January 1972.

Geography 

Demographics 
At the 2000 census of Bangladesh, Mirpur had a population of 1,074,232, of which males constituted 54.15% and females 45.85%. 610,270 were over the age of 18, and the average literacy rate was 68.9% (7+ years), compared to the national average of 48.6%. Mirpur Thana has recently been divided into the three thanas of Shah Ali, Pallabi and Kafrul.

Education

Colleges

 BCIC College
 Dhaka Commerce College
 Government Bangla College
 Monipur High School and College  (MUBC)
 SOS Hermann Gmeiner College
Sharoj International College

Universities

 Bangabandhu Sheikh Mujibur Rahman Maritime University (Temporary Campus)
 Bangladesh University of Business and Technology (BUBT)
 Bangladesh University of Professionals
 Military Institute of Science and Technology

For the cricket world cup of 2011, Mirpur's Sher-e-Bangla Cricket Stadium was selected as a venue. For this, renovations were carried out within the thana. The opening match was held there on 19 February 2011.

Fires
 November 5, 2018 - Chandrabindu Fashion House 
 April 14, 2019 - City Park Building, 
 July 3, 2019 - Mirpur 14 Slum
 August 16, 2019 - Mirpur 7, Cholontika Slum

Points of interest 
Mirpur Beribadh (dyke) is a place in Dhaka, the capital of Bangladesh. Mirpur thana is part of the Dhaka District in Dhaka Division. It is famous for various historical places in Dhaka city. The Dhaka Zoo, the National Botanical Garden of Bangladesh, Sher-e-Bangla Cricket Stadium,Sony Cinema Hall, the Nobel Prize-winning Grameen Bank’s head office, Mirpur Cantonment and educational institutions including Military Institute of Science and Technology, Bangladesh University of Professionals, SOS Hermann Gmeiner College, Dhaka Commerce College, Govt. Bangla College, Monipur High School, Ibn Sina Medical College, BCIC College are located here.

See also 

 Upazilas of Bangladesh
 Districts of Bangladesh
 Divisions of Bangladesh
 List of districts and suburbs of Dhaka

References 

Thanas of Dhaka